Rohit Sharma is an Indian cricketer who has represented the national team since 2007. He has made 43 centuries in international cricket30 in One Day Internationals (ODI), 9 in Tests and 4 in Twenty20 Internationals (T20Is)as of February 2023.

Sharma made his ODI debut against Ireland in June 2007. His first century came during the 2010 Tri-nation tournament in Zimbabwe when he made 114 against the hosts. In the 2013 bilateral series against Australia at home, he made two centuries, including a double-century. The next year, he scored 264 against Sri Lanka at the Eden Gardens, Kolkata. The score remains the highest individual total by a batsman in the format . In January 2016, he made 171 not out against Australia; it remained the highest score by a visiting batsman against Australia until England's Jason Roy made 180 in 2018. Sharma set the record for most centuries scored in a World Cup when he scored five centuries in the 2019 World Cup. He has scored centuries against nine different opponents and has the joint second-highest number of centuries (eight) against Australia in the format. , Sharma has eight scores in excess of 150, and three double-centuries, both of which are records in ODIs. He has the second highest number of centuries for an active player in the format.

Sharma made his Test debut during the 2013–14 home series against the West Indies. He scored 177 on his debut and went on to make another century in the next match. He scored three centuries in the home series against South Africa in October 2019including 176 and 127 in the first match, and a career-highest score of 212 in the third match.

Sharma made his T20I debut during the ICC T20 World Cup 2007 against England.
In October 2015, he became the second Indian to score a century in the T20I format when he made 106 against South Africa. Sharma jointly holds the record for the fastest T20I century (off 35 balls) with South Africa's David Miller and Czech Republic's Sudesh Wickramasekara. His four centuries in the format are the most by any player. , Sharma is ranked 13th among players with the most centuries in international cricket.

Key
 *  Remained not out
   Man of the match
   Captain of India in that match
 (D/L)  The result of the match was based upon the Duckworth–Lewis method

Test cricket centuries

One Day International cricket centuries

Twenty20 International cricket centuries

Notes

References

Sharma, Rohit
Indian cricket lists